Roman I may refer to:

 Roman I of Kiev (died in 1180)
 Roman I of Moldavia (Voivode of Moldavia from 1391 to 1394)